Cosmic Jackpot, also published under the title The Goldilocks Enigma: Why is the Universe Just Right for Life?, is a 2007 non-fiction book by physicist and cosmologist Paul Davies, describing the idea of a fine-tuned universe.

The Enigma

In Cosmic Jackpot, Davies argues that certain universal fundamental physical constants are precisely adjusted to make life in the Universe possible: that we have, in a sense, won a "cosmic jackpot," and that conditions are "just right" for life, as in The Story of the Three Bears. As Davies writes elsewhere, "There is now broad agreement among physicists and cosmologists that the universe is in several respects 'fine-tuned' for life."

After explaining this enigma, Davies discusses possible solutions, such as the anthropic principle, the idea of a multiverse which contains many different universes (including our "just right" one), and the idea of intelligent design.

The Multiverse

Davies also discusses a number of other ideas connected with the "multiverse." Much like a pencil falling to the ground from its tip in a trade off of symmetry for stability, Davies writes that the Big Bang could have established a complex but stable universe (or multiverse) from symmetry breaking as the heat radiation in "space" lowered abruptly past the Curie Point.

See also
 The Mind of God
 God and the New Physics
 About Time

References

External links
 Interview with Paul Davies about his book Cosmic Jackpot (starts at 40 min)
 Op-Ed Paul Davies New York Times Opinion-Editorial
 Paul Davies interview (Salon.com)
 

2007 non-fiction books
Anthropic principle
English-language books
Intelligent design books
Science books